"Disco's Revenge" is a song recorded by American house producer Gusto. It was released in February 1996 as a single only. The song, which mainly consists of a looped sample from Harvey Mason's 1979 song "Groovin' You", reached number nine in the United Kingdom and number one on the RPM Dance/Urban chart in Canada. The title quotes Frankie Knuckles, who had described house music as being "disco's revenge".

Critical reception
A reviewer from Music Week rated "Disco's Revenge" three out of five, adding that "New Jersey's Gusto delivers a classy, bassy track, which has been championed by Radio One but has limited crossover potential." James Hamilton from the RM Dance Update described it as a "Harvey Mason 'Groovin' You' riff based 'bum bum bum' bumbling simple hypnotic strider".

Track listings
 CD maxi - Europe
 "Disco's Revenge" (Short Dirty Mix) - 3:50 	
 "Disco's Revenge" (Church Mix) - 7:04 	
 "Disco's Revenge" (Mojo Beats) - 7:08

 CD maxi- Europe (Remixes)
 "Disco's Revenge" (Short Dirty Mix) - 3:51
 "Disco's Revenge" (Acappella) - 4:13
 "Disco's Revenge" (Antonio Bandera's Guitarra Mix) - 6:47
 "Disco's Revenge" (David Anthony & Tom Moulton Full Vocal) - 12:48
 "Disco's Revenge" (David Anthony UK Radio mix) - 3:16
 "Disco's Revenge" (David Anthony UK Vocal mix) - 6:34
 "Disco's Revenge" (Deep Dish Remix) - 12:31
 "Disco's Revenge" (GustHouse Remix) - 8:20
 "Disco's Revenge" (Johnny Vicious Remix) - 9:34

Charts

Weekly charts

Year-end charts

References

1995 songs
1996 singles
American house music songs